Krebssee is a lake in Kreis Herzogtum Lauenburg, Schleswig-Holstein, Germany.

Lakes of Schleswig-Holstein
LKrebssee